Sylvain Dupuy (born 22 June 1982) is a French rugby union player. His position is scrum-half and he currently plays for SU Agen in the Top 14. He began his career with Stade Toulousain, winning the Heineken Cup as a replacement in 2003, before moving to USA Perpignan in 2005 before moving to SU Agen in 2007.

References

1982 births
Living people
French rugby union players
Sportspeople from Albi
Stade Toulousain players
USA Perpignan players
SU Agen Lot-et-Garonne players
Rugby union scrum-halves